Quyujaq (also Romanized as Qūyūjāq; also known as Qūyjāq) is a village in Qezel Uzan Rural District, in the Central District of Meyaneh County, East Azerbaijan Province, Iran. At the 2006 census, its population was 248, in 62 families.

References 

Populated places in Meyaneh County